Kamýk nad Vltavou is a municipality and village in Příbram District in the Central Bohemian Region of the Czech Republic. It has about 1,000 inhabitants. It lies on the Vltava river.

Administrative parts

The village of Velká is an administrative part of Kamýk nad Vltavou.

History
The first written mention about the Vrškamýk Castle is from 1236 and about the settlements above the castle (Starý Kamýk and Nový Kamýk) from 1285.

References

Villages in Příbram District